Over the Under, also referred to as Down III: Over the Under, is the third studio album by American heavy metal band Down, released five years after their previous album, Down II: A Bustle in Your Hedgerow. It was released internationally on September 24, 2007, and in the United States on September 25, 2007.

Themes 
Lyrical themes of Over the Under include the band's anger about Hurricane Katrina, Phil Anselmo's frustration over the murder of Pantera guitarist Dimebag Darrell, and the bad blood between the two up until the guitarist's death.

Release and reception 

The album was leaked in full on or around August 29, 2007. The album was also released on LP, and in a special edition digipak featuring a bonus track and an extended booklet. The album debuted at No. 42 in the Irish Singles Chart on September 27, 2007. The album debuted at No. 26 on the U.S. Billboard 200 chart, selling about 29,000 copies in its first week. On the UK Album Charts, the album debuted at No. 46 on September 30, 2007.

Over the Under was No. 4 in Revolver's list of the 20 best albums of 2007 and No. 2 in Metal Hammers year-end list. It was ranked No. 37 on Rolling Stones list of the Top 50 Albums of 2007.

Reviews for the album were mixed. Matthew Cooper at Last Rites praised the production, musicianship, and backing vocals. He commended "Nothing in Return (Walk Away)" to be a "slow, massive nine-minute closer is a supremely commanding emotional climax built on a dominant back-and-forth drum pattern, astral noodling, and impassioned vocals, in an undeniable display of the band members' combined talents."  Don Kaye at Blabbermouth rated it 6.5/10 stars, and opined "the group is just not playing or writing at the top of its game here", as well as "many of the songs on III are drawn-out and unmemorable, consisting mainly of one or two riffs repeated over and over while Anselmo's vocals cascade and echo on top.  He heaped additional criticism on Anselmo's vocals as well, noticing a weakness he did not see while Anselmo was in his prime.  However, he noted there were flashes of the "old Down", referencing guitar work on "In the Thrall of It All", while saving his biggest praise for "Nothing in Return" as "the mournful, massive feel of some of the band's best early numbers and ends the album on a majestic note."  Vince Neilstein of MetalSucks rated it 3.5 out of 5 horns, echoing the mixed opinion, writing it "...isn't a spectacular album that is going to change the face of metal and save the day. But what it is is an awesome album to groove and smoke a bowl to while being reminded that metal doesn't always have to be all about tough guy posturing..."

Track listing

Notes 
On October 14, 2008, Down re-released Over the Under in a deluxe edition, containing 30 extra minutes of bonus footage and live performances on a DVD, as an exclusive item for Best Buy stores throughout the United States.

Personnel 
Down
Phil Anselmo – vocals, guitar on "The Path"
Pepper Keenan – guitar
Kirk Windstein – guitar
Rex Brown – bass
Jimmy Bower – drums

Additional musicians
Ross Karpelman – keyboards

Technical personnel
Warren Riker – producer, recording engineer, mixer
David "The Puma" Troia – additional engineering, Pro Tools
Jonas Grabarnick – Pro Tools
Rouble Kapoor – assistant engineer
Bo Jo – assistant engineer
Brian "Big Bass" Gardner – mastering
Vance Kelly – art direction and design
Pepper Keenan – art direction and design
Dove Shore – photography

Charts 
Album – Billboard (North America)

Tour dates

References

External links 
kvltsite.com review

Down (band) albums
2007 albums